Asioditomyia is a genus of fungus gnats in the family Ditomyiidae.

Species
A. japonica (Sasakawa, 1963)

References

Ditomyiidae
Sciaroidea genera